Raul "Raulzinho" Togni Neto  (born 19 May 1992) is a Brazilian professional basketball player for the Cleveland Cavaliers of the National Basketball Association (NBA). He is also a member of the senior men's Brazilian national basketball team.

Neto also holds an Italian passport.

Professional career
Neto was drafted by the Atlanta Hawks with the 47th pick in the 2013 NBA draft he was then immediately traded to the Utah Jazz

Minas Tênis Clube (2008–2011) 
Neto made his professional debut in 2008 with Minas Tênis Clube during the 2008–09 FIBA Americas League. He played a further three seasons for Minas and even represented the World Team at the 2010 Nike Hoop Summit.

Gipuzkoa (2011–2014) 
After averaging 12.6 points and 2.2 assists per game as a sixth man for Minas in 2010–11, Neto signed with Lagun Aro GBC of Spain for the 2011–12 season. After averaging 8.5 points and 2.9 assists per game during the 2012–13 season with Lagun Aro GBC, Neto was selected with the 47th overall pick in the 2013 NBA draft by the Atlanta Hawks. He was later traded to the Utah Jazz on draft night. However, he did not join the Jazz and instead returned to Lagun Aro GBC for the 2013–14 season.

Murcia (2014–2015) 
On August 1, 2014, Neto signed a three-year deal with UCAM Murcia. He parted ways with the club following the 2014–15 season in order to sign in the NBA.

Utah Jazz (2015–2019) 
On July 9, 2015, Neto signed with the Utah Jazz. He made his debut for the Jazz in the team's season opener against the Detroit Pistons on October 28, 2015, recording 8 points and 3 assists as a starter in a 92–87 loss. On January 27, 2016, Neto was selected to the 2016 Rising Stars Challenge as a member of the World Team. On February 19, 2016, he scored a season-high 15 points in a 111–93 win over the Boston Celtics. On January 9, 2017, he spent a day with the Salt Lake City Stars, Utah's D-League affiliate. He was reassigned to Salt Lake City on January 11, 2017, and then recalled the next day. He played 9 of 11 matches of the Jazz during the playoffs. On July 6, 2018, Neto re-signed with the Jazz. On July 2, 2019, Neto was waived by the Jazz due to the Mike Conley trade with Grizzlies.

Philadelphia 76ers (2019–2020) 
On July 4, 2019, Neto agreed to sign with the Philadelphia 76ers.

Washington Wizards (2020–2022) 
On November 22, 2020, Neto signed with the Washington Wizards. As a member of the 2020-2021 Wizards, Neto appeared in 5 playoff games and started in 3.

Cleveland Cavaliers (2022–present) 
On July 8, 2022, Neto signed with the Cleveland Cavaliers on a one year, $2,463,490 contract.

NBA career statistics

Regular season

|- 
| align="left" | 
| align="left" | Utah
| 81 || 53 || 18.5'' || .431 || .395 || .743 || 1.5 || 2.1 || .8 || .0 || 5.9
|- 
| align="left" | 
| align="left" | Utah
| 40 || 0 || 8.6 || .451 || .323 || .889 || .8 || .9 || .5 || .1 || 2.5
|- 
| align="left" | 
| align="left" | Utah
| 41 || 0 || 12.1 || .457 || .404 || .743 || 1.2 || 1.8 || .3 || .1 || 4.5
|- 
| align="left" | 
| align="left" | Utah
| 37 || 1 || 12.8 || .460 || .333 || .848 || 1.7 || 2.5 || .4 || .1 || 5.3
|- 
| align="left" | 
| align="left" | Philadelphia
| 54 || 3 || 12.4 || .455 || .386 || .830 || 1.1 || 1.8 || .4 || .1 || 5.1
|- 
| align="left" | 
| align="left" | Washington
| 64 || 22 || 21.9 || .468 || .390 || .882 || 2.4 || 2.3 || 1.1 || .1 || 8.7
|- 
| align="left" | 
| align="left" | Washington
| 70 || 19 || 19.6 || .463 || .292 || .769 || 1.9 || 3.1 || .8 || .0 || 7.5
|- class="sortbottom"
| align="center" colspan="2"| Career
| 387 || 98 || 16.2 || .455 || .366 || .804 || 1.6 || 2.2 || .7 || .1 || 6.0

Playoffs

|-
| style="text-align:left;"| 2017
| style="text-align:left;"| Utah
| 9 || 0 || 6.7 || .615 || .500 || 1.000 || .8 || .4 || .1 || .1 || 2.6
|-
| style="text-align:left;"| 2018
| style="text-align:left;"| Utah
| 8 || 0 || 9.0 || .304 || .286 || 1.000 || 1.3 || 1.3 || .3 || .0 || 2.6
|-
| style="text-align:left;"| 2019
| style="text-align:left;"| Utah
| 3 || 0 || 6.5 || .167 || .000 || — || 1.0 || .3 || .0 || .0 || .7
|-
| style="text-align:left;"| 2020
| style="text-align:left;"| Philadelphia
| 2 || 0 || 13.0 || .333 || .400 || — || 1.5 || 1.5 || .5 || .0 || 4.0
|-
| style="text-align:left;"| 2021
| style="text-align:left;"| Washington
| 5 || 3 || 22.4 || .353 || .267 || .800 || 2.2 || 1.0 || .4 || .0 || 6.4
|- class="sortbottom"
| align="center" colspan="2"| Career
| 27 || 3 || 10.7 || .365 || .324 || .929 || 1.3 || .9 || .2 || .0 || 3.2

National team career
Neto gained attention after leading the Brazil under-18 team to an impressive runners-up showing at the 2010 FIBA Americas Under-18 Championship. He followed that up by being the youngest member of the senior Brazil national basketball team during the 2010 FIBA World Championship, but played sparingly. He later participated for the senior national team at the 2012 Summer Olympics, the 2013 FIBA AmeriCup, and the 2014 FIBA Basketball World Cup. During the World Cup, he had a strong performance against Argentina in the round of 16, when he scored 21 points to lead Brazil to a win. Neto also played at the 2016 Summer Olympics.

References

External links

FIBA Profile
Raulzinho Neto at acb.com 

1992 births
Living people
2010 FIBA World Championship players
2014 FIBA Basketball World Cup players
Atlanta Hawks draft picks
Basketball players at the 2012 Summer Olympics
Basketball players at the 2016 Summer Olympics
Brazilian people of Italian descent
Brazilian men's basketball players
Brazilian expatriate basketball people in Spain
Brazilian expatriate basketball people in the United States
CB Murcia players
Cleveland Cavaliers players
Gipuzkoa Basket players
Liga ACB players
Minas Tênis Clube basketball players
National Basketball Association players from Brazil
Novo Basquete Brasil players
Olympic basketball players of Brazil
Philadelphia 76ers players
Point guards
Salt Lake City Stars players
Sportspeople from Belo Horizonte
Utah Jazz players
Washington Wizards players